This is a List of Privy Counsellors of the United Kingdom appointed between the accession of King Edward VIII in 1936 and the death of King George VI in 1952.

Edward VIII, 1936
Sir Akbar Hydari (1869–1942)
Sir George Rich (1863–1956)
The Duke of Norfolk (1908–1975)
Michael Joseph Savage (1872–1940)
The Earl De La Warr (1900–1976)
John Colville (1894–1954)
Euan Wallace (1892–1941)
The Duke of Beaufort (1900–1984)
The Duke of Sutherland (1888–1963)
Hon. Alec Hardinge (1894–1960)
William Morrison (1893–1961)

George VI, 1936–1952

1937
The Lord Hutchison of Montrose (1873–1950)
Robert Menzies (1894–1978)
John Stephen Curlewis (1863–1940)
The Duke of Buccleuch (1894–1973)
Sir Harry Eve (1856–1940)
Sir Nevile Henderson (1882–1942)
Prince George, Duke of Kent (1902–1942)
Leslie Burgin (1887–1945)
Ernest Lapointe (1876–1941)
Sir Patrick Duncan (1870–1943)
The Viscount Galway (1882–1943)
The Lord Gowrie (1872–1955)
The Lord Tweedsmuir (1875–1940)
Sir Felix Cassel, Bt (1869–1953)
Isaac Foot (1880–1960)
Sir George Courthope, Bt (1877–1955)
Frederick Pethick-Lawrence (1871–1962)
Hon. Sir Hugh O'Neill (1883–1982)
The Lord Snell (1865–1944)
Sir Frank MacKinnon (1871–1946)
Sir Thomas Horridge (1857–1938)
Sir George Talbot (1861–1938)
Sir Robert Craigie (1883–1959)

1938
Sir John Anderson (1882–1958)
Robert Hudson (1886–1957)
The Earl of Lucan (1860–1949)
Sir Albert Clauson (1870–1946)
The Lord Porter (1877–1956)
James Stratford (1869–1952)
Sir Donald Somervell (1889–1960)
The Viscount Finlay (1875–1945)
Sir Fairfax Luxmoore (1876–1944)
Sir Rayner Goddard (1877–1971)
Sir Herbert du Parcq (1880–1949)

1939
The Viscount Chilston (1876–1947)
Rab Butler (1902–1982)
Harry Crookshank (1893–1961)
Sir Reginald Dorman-Smith (1899–1977)
The Lord Chatfield (1873–1967)
M. R. Jayakar (1873–1959)
Richard Casey (1890–1976)
Hon. James Stuart (1897–1971)
Herwald Ramsbotham (1887–1971)
Sir Philip Macdonell (1873–1940)
The Marquess of Lothian (1882–1940)
The Lord Hankey (1877–1963)
Geoffrey Fisher (1887–1972)
Sir Ronald Campbell (1883–1953)
Nicolaas Jacobus de Wet (1873–1960)

1940
Sir Andrew Duncan (1884–1952)
Sir George Branson (1871–1951)
Sir John Reith (1889–1971)
The Lord Woolton (1883–1964)
Ernest Bevin (1881–1951)
Brendan Bracken (1901–1958)
Sir Walter Citrine (1887–1983)
Ronald Cross (1896–1968)
Hugh Dalton (1887–1962)
Sir Charles Edwards (1867–1954)
Sir Percy Harris, Bt (1876–1952)
Sir Robert Vansittart (1881–1957)
Peter Fraser (1884–1950)
The Duke of Hamilton (1903–1973)
Viscount Cranborne (1893–1972)
John Moore-Brabazon (1884–1964)
Oliver Lyttelton (1893–1972)
Arthur Blaikie Purvis (1890–1941)

1941
Douglas Clifton Brown (1879–1958)
Sir Walter Womersley (1878–1961)
Sir Arthur Salter (1881–1975)
Frederick Leathers (1883–1965)
John Llewellin (1893–1957)
Vincent Massey (1887–1967)
James Reid (1890–1975)
Sir Miles Lampson (1880–1964)
Hon. Sir Stafford Cripps (1889–1952)
Raoul Dandurand (1861–1942)
Gwilym Lloyd George (1894–1967)
Harold Balfour (1897–1988)
Tom Williams (1888–1967)
Sir Sidney Abrahams (1885–1957)
Sir Chettur Madhavan Nair (1879–1970)

1942
Harold Macmillan (1894–1986)
Sir James Grigg (1890–1964)
The Lord Portal (1885–1949)
John Curtin (1885–1945)
Arthur Fadden (1894–1973)
H. V. Evatt (1894–1965)
Cyril Garbett (1875–1955)
George Hall (1881–1965)

1943
Richard Law (1901–1980)
Osbert Peake (1897–1966)
William Whiteley (1882–1955)
The Lord Cherwell (1886–1957)
The Lord Templemore (1880–1953)
Geoffrey Lloyd (1902–1984)
Joseph Westwood (1884–1948)
Harcourt Johnstone (1895–1945)
Sir Alan Lascelles (1887–1981)
The Viscount Wavell (1883–1950)
Henry Willink (1894–1973)
Ernest Frederick Watermeyer (1880–1958)
Ben Smith (1879–1964)

1944
Ralph Assheton (1901–1984)
Sir Archibald Clark Kerr (1882–1951)
William Mabane (1895–1969)
Wilfred Paling (1883–1971)
Charles Waterhouse (1893–1975)
Sir Gavin Simonds (1881–1971)
James Chuter Ede (1882–1965)
Frank Forde (1890–1983)
Hon. Sir Geoffrey Lawrence (1880–1971)
Sir John Beaumont (1877–1974)
Sir Fergus Morton (1887–1973)
Duncan Sandys (1908–1987)
Sir Edward Grigg (1879–1955)

1945
Florence Horsbrugh (1889–1969)
Ellen Wilkinson (1891–1947)
The Lord Croft (1881–1947)
Jack Lawson (1881–1965)
James Milner (1889–1967)
Sir Geoffrey Shakespeare, Bt (1893–1980)
Will Thorne (1857–1946)
Graham White (1880–1965)
Sir Richard Hopkins (1880–1955)
The Earl of Rosebery (1882–1974)
Sir David Maxwell Fyfe (1900–1967)
Ben Chifley (1885–1951)
Alfred Barnes (1887–1974)
George Isaacs (1883–1979)
John Wilmot (1893–1964)
Aneurin Bevan (1897–1960)
Manny Shinwell (1884–1986)
George Thomson (1893–1962)
William Wand (1885–1977)
The Lord Winster (1885–1961)
Jim Griffiths (1890–1975)
Sir Cuthbert Headlam, Bt (1876–1964)
Malcolm McCorquodale (1901–1971)
Lewis Silkin (1889–1972)
George Tomlinson (1890–1952)
Ted Williams (1890–1963)
The Lord Ammon (1873–1960)
The Duke of Abercorn (1869–1953)
Jan Hendrik Hofmeyr (1894–1948)
Sir James Tucker (1888–1975)
Gideon Brand van Zyl (1873–1956)
Philip Noel-Baker (1889–1982)
Sir Alfred Townsend Bucknill (1880–1963)

1946
Jack Beasley (1895–1949)
Sir Travers Humphreys (1867–1956)
James Lorimer Ilsley (1894–1967)
Bill Jordan (1879–1959)
Walter Nash (1882–1968)
Louis St. Laurent (1882–1973)
The Lord Uthwatt (1879–1949)
Hon. Sir Cyril Asquith (1890–1954)
Sir Lionel Cohen (1888–1973)
John Strachey (1901–1963)
Hon. Sir Alexander Cadogan (1884–1968)
The Viscount Mersey (1872–1956)
C. D. Howe (1886–1960)
The Earl of Listowel (1906–1997)
Sir Hartley Shawcross (1902–2003)
The Lord Nathan (1889–1963)
Frederick Bellenger (1894–1968)
Arthur Creech Jones (1891–1964)
Hector McNeil (1907–1955)

1947
Clement Davies (1884–1962)
James Gardiner (1883–1962)
Glenvil Hall (1887–1962)
Arthur Henderson (1893–1968)
Ian Alistair Mackenzie (1890–1949)
Charles Key (1883–1964)
The Earl Mountbatten of Burma (1900–1979)
The Lord Inman (1892–1979)
Lord Moncrieff (1870–1949)
Sir Frederic Wrottesley (1880–1948)
Sir Raymond Evershed (1899–1966)
John MacDermott (1896–1979)
Sir Norman Birkett (1883–1962)
The Lord Catto (1879–1959)
Ness Edwards (1897–1968)
Sir Godfrey Huggins (1883–1971)
George Mathers (1886–1965)
Harold Wilson (1916–1995)
Thibaudeau Rinfret (1879–1962)
Hugh Gaitskell (1906–1963)
John Wheatley (1908–1988)
Arthur Woodburn (1890–1978)
George Strauss (1901–1993)

1948
George Buchanan (1890–1955)
David Kirkwood (1872–1955)
William McKell (1891–1985)
Sir Malcolm Macnaghten (1869–1955)
George Heaton Nicholls (1876–1959)
Sir Humphrey O'Leary (1886–1953)
The Lord Pakenham (1905–2001)
Sir Frank Soskice (1902–1979)
Sir John Singleton (1885–1957)
Sir Alfred Denning (1899–1999)

1949
The Lord Hailey (1872–1969)
Hilary Marquand (1901–1972)
Edith Summerskill (1901–1980)
Sir David Jenkins (1899–1969)
The Lord Radcliffe (1899–1977)
John Dugdale (1905–1963)
Sir Oliver Franks (1905–1992)
The Lord Morrison (1881–1953)
Lord Patrick (1889–1967)
Sir Lionel Leach (1883–1960)

1950
Sir Ronald Campbell (1890–1983)
Jack Holloway (1875–1967)
D. S. Senanayake (1883–1952)
Patrick Gordon Walker (1907–1980)
Maurice Webb (1904–1956)
Richard Stokes (1897–1957)
Sidney Holland (1893–1961)
The Lord Henderson (1891–1984)

1951
Sir Owen Dixon (1886–1972)
The Earl of Drogheda (1884–1957)
The Lord Macdonald of Gwaenysgor (1888–1966)
Sir Charles Hodson (1895–1984)
Alfred Robens (1910–1999)
George Brown (1914–1985)
Sir John Morris (1896–1979)
David Grenfell (1881–1968)
Hon. Kenneth Younger (1908–1976)
The Lord Ogmore (1903–1976)
The Lord Ismay (1887–1965)
Sir Walter Monckton (1891–1965)
Patrick Buchan-Hepburn (1901–1974)
Selwyn Lloyd (1904–1978)
Peter Thorneycroft (1909–1994)
The Lord de L'Isle and Dudley (1909–1991)
James Thomas (1903–1960)
David Eccles (1904–1999)
Anthony Head (1906–1983)
Sir Thomas Dugdale, Bt (1897–1977)
Alan Lennox-Boyd (1904–1983)
James Latham Clyde (1898–1975)
The Earl of Home (1903–1995)
Princess Elizabeth, Duchess of Edinburgh (1926-2022)
Prince Philip, Duke of Edinburgh (1921–2021)
Sir Charles Romer (1897–1969)
Arthur Bottomley (1907–1995)
Douglas Jay (1907–1996)
The Lord Shepherd (1881–1954)
Robert Taylor (1881–1954)

1952
Sir Ulick Alexander (1889–1973)
Charles Williams (1886–1955)

References

1936